Lee Sung-hye may refer to:

 Lee Seong-hye (born 1988), South Korean Miss Korea 2011 titleholder
 Lee Sung-hye (taekwondo) (born 1984), South Korean taekwondo practitioner